Dennis Michael Locorriere  (born June 13, 1949; Union City, New Jersey, United States) is the American lead vocalist and guitarist of the country rock group Dr. Hook (formerly Dr. Hook & the Medicine Show).

Career
Locorriere, as a founding member of Dr. Hook, was the recipient of more than 60 gold and platinum singles, gaining No. 1 chart status in more than 42 countries. He is also a songwriter, whose songs have been recorded by Bob Dylan, Crystal Gayle, BJ Thomas, Helen Reddy, Willie Nelson, Southside Johnny, Olivia Newton-John, and by Jerry Lee Lewis, on his 2006 release, Last Man Standing.

Locorriere, whose company retains ownership of the trademark name Dr. Hook, tours worldwide billed as "Dr. Hook".

Locorriere has contributed his vocals to the albums of others, such as Randy Travis' Always and Forever album (1987). His solo performances include songs from his past, as well as newer material from his solo period.

Locorriere has released three solo albums, Out of the Dark (2000), One of the Lucky Ones (2005) and Post Cool (2010).  A compilation album, Alone in the Studio/The Lost Tapes, was released in 2008.  Locorriere released a live CD, Dennis Locorriere - Live in Liverpool (2004), as well as a concert DVD of his solo show, Alone With Dennis Locorriere (2002), a top ten concert DVD of the Dr Hook Hits and History tour (2007) and a concert DVD of the Post Cool tour (2011).

Locorriere performed in The Devil And Billy Markham at Lincoln Center, New York in 1989. It was written by Shel Silverstein, and directed by Gregory Mosher.

In November 2000, he toured his Voice of Dr. Hook concert in Australia; and toured there again in May 2015.

In 2007, Locorriere and his band embarked on the Dennis Locorriere Celebrates Dr. Hook Hits and History tour.  In early 2008, Locorriere toured the United Kingdom, as a member of Bill Wyman's Rhythm Kings.

In early 2010, Locorriere again toured in the United Kingdom, promoting his new Post Cool album.

In 2014, he toured in Australia for the first time in nearly 15 years.

Discography and DVD

Studio albums
 Out of the Dark (Track Records, 2000)
 One of the Lucky Ones (Track Records, 2005)
 Post Cool (2010)

Live albums
 Alone with... (2002)
 Live in Liverpool (2004)
 Post Cool Live (2011)
 The Voice Of Dr Hook  (2021) - Vinyl

Compilation albums
 Alone in the Studio/The Lost Tapes (2008)
 Retrospection (2011)

DVDs
 Alone with Dennis Locorriere (2006)
 Hits and History Tour Live (2007)
 Post Cool Live (2011)

References

External links
Dennis Locorriere's website
Dr Hook Official website

1949 births
Living people
American expatriates in the United Kingdom
American male singers
American rock singers
American country guitarists
American male guitarists
American rock guitarists
People from Union City, New Jersey
People from Sussex
Dr. Hook & the Medicine Show members
American people of French-Canadian descent
20th-century American guitarists
Country musicians from New Jersey
20th-century American male musicians
Proper Records artists